"Oklahoma Swing" is a song recorded by American country music artists Vince Gill and Reba McEntire.  It was released in January 1990 as the second single from Gill's album When I Call Your Name.  The song reached number 13 on the Billboard Hot Country Singles & Tracks chart.  It was written by Gill and Tim DuBois.

Critical reception
Thom Jurek of Allmusic called the song a "smoking Western swing duet".

Chart performance

References

Songs about Oklahoma
1990 singles
Vince Gill songs
Reba McEntire songs
Songs written by Tim DuBois
Songs written by Vince Gill
Song recordings produced by Tony Brown (record producer)
MCA Records singles
1989 songs
Male–female vocal duets